U-33 may refer to one of the following German submarines:

 , was a Type U 31 submarine launched in 1914 and that served in the First World War until surrendered on 16 January 1919
 During the First World War, Germany also had these submarines with similar names:
 , a Type UB II submarine launched in 1915 and sunk on 11 April 1918
 , a Type UC II submarine launched in 1916 and sunk on 26 September 1917
 , a Type VIIA submarine that served in the Second World War until sunk on 12 February 1940
 , a Type 212 submarine of the Bundesmarine that was launched in 2004 and in active service

Submarines of Germany